Baz Qand (also Romanized as Bāz Qand) is a village in Tabas Rural District, in the Central District of Khoshab County, Razavi Khorasan Province, Iran. At the 2006 census, its population was 188, in 67 families.

References 

Populated places in Khoshab County